The Lake Catherine Quarry is a prehistoric stone quarry in Hot Spring County, Arkansas.  The site was used as a source of black novaculite, a relatively rare form of chert.  Evidence of Native American quarrying activity at the site includes quarry pits, spoil piles, and a scattered talus slope of rejected materials.  The site is untainted by historic quarrying, providing a potentially significant window into prehistoric quarrying methods.

The quarry site was listed on the National Register of Historic Places in 1975.

See also 
 Hell's Half Acre (Hot Springs, Arkansas): a possible Native American chert quarry in Arkansas
 Jones Mill Site: nearby archaeological site with Native American stone tool construction artifacts
 National Register of Historic Places listings in Hot Spring County, Arkansas

References

Archaeological sites on the National Register of Historic Places in Arkansas
Quarries in the United States
National Register of Historic Places in Hot Spring County, Arkansas
Chert
Mining in Arkansas
Native American history of Arkansas
Quarry